The Ambassador of Malaysia to the Republic of Peru is the head of Malaysia's diplomatic mission to Peru. The position has the rank and status of an Ambassador Extraordinary and Plenipotentiary and is based in the Embassy of Malaysia, Lima.

List of heads of mission

Ambassadors to Peru

See also
 Malaysia–Peru relations
 List of ambassadors of Peru to Malaysia

References 

 
Peru
Malaysia